Arūnas Mikalauskas (born 14 September 1997) is a Lithuanian basketball player for Crailsheim Merlins of the Basketball Bundesliga (BBL).

Career
Born in Klaipėda, Mikalauskas started his career with his hometown team Neptūnas and the Vladas Knašius Basketball School.

In 2019, Mikalauskas signed with Dutch side Aris Leeuwarden. He averaged 12.8 points and 8.1 rebounds before the season was cancelled due to the COVID-19 pandemic. With Aris, he also reached the final of the NBB Cup, which was never played.

In the 2020–21 season, Mikalauskas played with Feyenoord Basketball. This became his breakout season as he averaged 18.1 points and 7.1 rebounds per game while leading Feyenoord to a fifth place. After the regular season, Mikalauskas was named to the All-DBL Team.

On July 7, 2021, he has signed with ZZ Leiden in the Dutch Basketball League (DBL).

On July 4, 2022, he has signed with Crailsheim Merlins of the Basketball Bundesliga (BBL).

References

External links
Proballers profile

1997 births
Living people
Aris Leeuwarden players
BC Neptūnas players
Crailsheim Merlins players
Dutch Basketball League players
Feyenoord Basketball players
Lithuanian men's basketball players
People from Klaipėda
Small forwards
ZZ Leiden players